Fort Trenholm, also known as Battery Trenholm, is a historic artillery battery located at Johns Island, Charleston, South Carolina. It was built in 1864, to reinforce Fort Pringle and protect the Stono River and Johns Island. It has emplacements for 17 guns. The three-sided earthen redoubt measures approximately 870 feet on its eastern face, 780 feet long on its southern face, and 885 feet long on its western face. It has a 15-foot-high parapet wall.

It was listed on the National Register of Historic Places in 1982.

References 

Military facilities on the National Register of Historic Places in South Carolina
Buildings and structures completed in 1864
Buildings and structures in Charleston County, South Carolina
National Register of Historic Places in Charleston, South Carolina
American Civil War on the National Register of Historic Places